The Ukrop's Monument Avenue 10K, also known as the Monument Avenue 10K, is an annual 10-kilometer road running event, sanctioned by USA Track and Field. The race is run on historic Monument Avenue in Richmond, Virginia. Begun in 2000, the race has grown to be the fourth-largest 10k in the country and the 22nd largest race of any distance in the world. It has been named by USA Today as one of the ten great road races in the United States. The event has 30 bands, dozens of spirit groups and many costumed runners.

In 2006, Barbara and Jenna Bush ran the race under aliases. In 2007 the race had over 25,000 registered runners making it the fourth-largest 10k in America.

Winners and participants
 = Course record

Race promotion and charity
Race promotions are officially run by the non-profit group Sports Backers, which promotes an active lifestyle in the area. Sports Backers have programs that support youth running, bike infrastructure and fitness opportunities for the underserved. It is sponsored by Kroger.

The Massey Cancer Center in Richmond, Virginia is one of the charitable partners of the 10K.  The Massey Fundraising Challenge supports the world-class cancer research being done there. The other charity is the Sports Backers' Kids Run RVA program to provide support for youth running  throughout the Richmond area.  More than 12,000 kids are part of the program annually and a particular emphasis is placed on providing opportunities for underserved youth to participate.

References
Sports Backers - Ukrop's Monument Avenue 10k - Past Results - Winner and participant data.

External links

Official Monument Avenue 10k website
Richmond Times-Dispatch - 2010 recap
Ukrop's website on community events, including the 10k

10K runs
10K
Sports in Richmond, Virginia
Road running competitions in the United States
Recurring sporting events established in 2000
Annual sporting events in the United States
2000 establishments in Virginia